Sergeant Dato' Awang anak Raweng P.S.B.S., GC,(Rt) (20 April 1929 – 18 September 2020) also known as "Tua Kampung" (headman) an Iban Scout from Sarawak in Borneo, was awarded the George Cross for gallantry as recorded in the London Gazette on 20 November 1951.   	

He was attached to 10 Platoon, 'D' Company, 1st Battalion Worcestershire Regiment in Malaya when their jungle patrol was attacked by 50 communist terrorists in Kluang, Johor, Malaya.  Two members of the platoon, the leading scout and the section commander, were killed while Awang was wounded in the thigh.  Despite his injury he pulled Private G. Hughes to cover.  Awang returned fire, repulsing every attempt by the bandits to advance, despite suffering a severe wound to his right arm.  As the bandits surrounded the injured pair, Awang clasped a grenade in his left hand and dared the bandits to attack him.  He held off the communists for forty minutes, forcing them to withdraw and saved Private Hughes's life.

His citation concluded "So resolute was his demeanour that the bandits, who had maintained their attacks for some forty minutes, and who were now threatened by the other sections, withdrew.  The coolness, fortitude and offensive spirit displayed by Awang anak Rawang were of the highest order. Despite being twice severely wounded he showed the utmost courage and resolution to continue the fight and protect the injured soldier."

He was also the recipient of the Queen Elizabeth II Coronation, Silver, Golden and Diamond Jubilee Medals and Pingat Jasa Malaysia. On 27 October 2015, he was honoured by National Defence University of Malaysia with the Honorary master's degree in Strategic Studies in conjunction with the University's 6th convocation ceremony. He was a longhouse chief (Tuai Rumah) at his birthplace, Nanga Skrang, and he also received monthly allowances from both the Malaysian and British Governments.

On 13 October 2018, the Sarawak State Government officially bestowed him the Panglima Setia Bintang Sarawak award, which carried the title Dato', as a recognition of his heroism in conjunction with the Governor of Sarawak's 82nd Birthday Celebration.

He died at the age of 91 in September 2020, at his residence in Sri Aman. The news was confirmed by the Department of Malaysian Armed Forces Veteran Affairs.

Honours and awards

 Panglima Setia Bintang Sarawak (Commander of the Most Exalted Order of the Star of Sarawak) (awarded 2018)
 George Cross
 General Service Medal (1918) (United Kingdom) with "Malaya" clasp (for the participation in Malayan Emergency)
 Queen Elizabeth II Coronation Medal (awarded 1953)
 Queen Elizabeth II Silver Jubilee Medal (awarded 1977)
 Queen Elizabeth II Golden Jubilee Medal (awarded 2002)
 Queen Elizabeth II Diamond Jubilee Medal(awarded 2012)
 Pingat Jasa Malaysia (Malaysia Service Medal)
 Honorary master's degree in Strategic Studies, by National Defence University of Malaysia

References

1929 births
2020 deaths
Iban people
Malaysian recipients of the George Cross
People from Sarawak
People of the Malayan Emergency